Austrian Financial Market Authority (FMA) is the integrated financial regulatory authority for the Austrian financial industry.  It is responsible for the supervision of credit institutions, payment institutions, insurance companies, pension funds, Fund managers, licensed securities service providers, rating agencies and stock exchanges.

The FMA is an independent authority within the framework of the Financial Market Authority Act (FMABG) which means that it is not bound by any political directives in the exercise of its office. However, the Ministry of Finance (Austria) has the right to consent to individual FMA regulations. In addition, with Austria being a member of the European Union, the FMA works closely with European supervisory authorities including the European Banking Authority (EBA), European Insurance and Occupational Pensions Authority (EIOPA) and European Securities and Markets Authority (ESMA).

History
The origin of the FMA dates back to 1880. At that time, the Assecuranz-Bureau was set up under Emperor Franz Joseph I of Austria due to the steadily increasing distrust of the Ministry of the Interior to supervise the booming insurance industry.

The tasks were defined in the founding acts as follows:

Insurance regulations have become more stringent over the years, but it was not until 1978 that the Federal Act on the Operation and Supervision of Contract Insurance re-regulated supervision.

The entire insurance industry was liberalized by joining the EEA and later the European Union. Accordingly, the supervision was adjusted.

On April 1, 2002, the FMA was created as an integrated regulator for all financial markets and began operations as an independent authority within the framework of the Financial Market Authority Act (FMABG). This law was passed in the summer of 2001 after lengthy political discussions about the establishment of an integrated financial supervision system. The FMA was established as an institution under public law with its own legal personality, and it was entrusted with the supervision of banks, insurance companies, pension funds and the entire securities sector.

Tasks
The tasks of the FMA regarding the supervision of the Austrian financial market are divided into five main areas:

 Supervising banking capital, conduct, and lending (in cooperation with the Oesterreichische Nationalbank)
 Supervising insurance capital, conduct, and products
 Supervising pension funds
 Supervising securities markets
 Supervising payment processing

Consumer protection

The FMA is not a consumer protection organization in the traditional sense, in that can help complainants in enforcing any claims for damages or claims against a supervised company. As a supervisor, it must maintain objectivity towards all supervised entities and their clients. Damaged consumers must in principle sue for any claims for damages in civil courts.

However, information and complaints from consumers, investors or creditors against market participants are an important source of information for supervisory activities. The FMA investigates every customer complaint and checks whether it is based on systemic errors. The FMA's complaint management and consumer hotline therefore provide information about the legal options and ensure that all information is checked with regard to relevant undesirable developments or possible violations of supervisory standards. Since a complainant does not have party status in an administrative procedure, the FMA does not provide any information on the progress and outcome of the proceedings because of their obligation to maintain privacy. However, if the complainant also sues under civil law, the court can inspect the files by way of administrative assistance.

Complaints about supervised companies can be submitted using a complaint form on the FMA website. Since January 2014, it has also been possible to report abuses or violations of supervisory law in a company that is subject to FMA supervision anonymously via a whistleblower process.

International cooperation
The FMA is a member of various international bodies, such as: International Association of Insurance Supervisors (IAIS), International Organization of Securities Commissions (IOSCO) and Committee of European Securities Regulators (CESR).

On November 4, 2014, the European Central Bank assumed direct and indirect supervision for all banks in the euro area. The ECB has shared its supervisory responsibility with the national banking supervisory authorities in accordance with the requirements of the European legislator in the so-called Single Supervisory Mechanism (SSM).

For banks that are subject to the direct supervision of the ECB in the "Single European Supervisory Mechanism" (SSM), a separate resolution authority was created at European level ("Single Resolution Mechanism - SRM"). As the national resolution authority for Austria, the FMA is part of the SRM.

Board of Directors 
Helmut Ettl has been a board member of the FMA since 2008, and Klaus Kumpfmüller became a board member in 2013. After Kumpfmüller was appointed by the supervisory board as the successor to Andreas Mitterlehner, who died in November 2019, as chairman of the Board of HYPO Oberösterreich, it became known that Eduard Müller, a former Austrian finance minister was appointed to the Board of Management on an interim basis. In May 2020, Müller's appointment as a board member of the FMA was confirmed by the Council of Ministers.

See also
Regulatory authority
Banking in Austria

References

Financial regulatory authorities of Austria
Banking in Austria